Fremont, Elkhorn and Missouri Valley Railroad Depot may refer to:

Fremont, Elkhorn and Missouri Valley Railroad Depot (Dwight, Nebraska), listed on the National Register of Historic Places in Butler County, Nebraska
Fremont, Elkhorn and Missouri Valley Railroad Depot (Plainview, Nebraska), listed on the National Register of Historic Places in Pierce County, Nebraska